Mathihalli is a village about 100 kilometres from Bellary in Karnataka, India. The village is ancient but still exists with a small population but little infrastructure.

References 

Villages in Davanagere district